George Fields (born 1935 or 1936) is a former American football player who played two seasons with the Oakland Raiders. He played college football at Bakersfield Junior College.

References

1930s births
Living people
American football defensive tackles
Bakersfield Renegades football players
Oakland Raiders players
Players of American football from Berkeley, California
Place of birth missing (living people)
American Football League players